Olearia odorata, the scented tree daisy, is a small divaricating shrub endemic to New Zealand, from the plant family Asteraceae.
It has small light green leaves with a large amount of interlacing twigs and grows to around 2–4m in height. In spring O. odorata produces many small white flowers.

Remnants of this bush that grow in Otago are home to native moths and insects, and areas with this species are now being protected with covenants. This plant is associated with the nationally endangered moth Stathmopoda albimaculata.

References

odorata
Divaricating plants